Gradski stadion u Poljudu, better known as Stadion Poljud or simply Poljud, is a multi-use stadium in Split, Croatia, which has been the home ground of  Hajduk Split football club since 1979. The stadium is located in the neighbourhood of Poljud, which belongs to city district of Spinut. It was opened in September 1979, and has a seating capacity of 33.987

The venue was built to host the 1979 Mediterranean Games and was opened by then Yugoslav president Josip Broz Tito. It had an original capacity of 55,000, increased to 62,000 in the 1980s, before being equipped with seats in the 1990s thus reducing the capacity to 33.987

Poljud Stadium was also the venue for the 1990 European Athletics Championships and 2010 IAAF Continental Cup, while from 2013 to 2018, it hosted Ultra Europe annually.

Design

Its trademark is a seashell-like design by Croatian architect Boris Magaš with a roof structure spanning at 206×47 meters. Its design offers views of nearby hills and forests from the stands, modelled after ancient Greek theaters. Suspended on the west roof "shell" are 19 cabins, 7 of them are used by TV reporters, with the others occupied by cameras, central referee station, photo finish, scoreboard, audio control, etc. All of these are interconnected via a catwalk that runs through a structure spanning the entire roof giving access to the cabins, as well as to the 630 Philips lights, placed along the brim and inner side of the roof.
 
Stands are supported by a construction of reinforced concrete with entrances via 12 bridges placed 30–40 meters apart around the entire stadium as well as eight staircases. Underneath them is a trench holding office areas. The area around the stadium is composed of 60,000 square meters of designed landscape with greenery designated for pedestrians, with the stadium slightly beneath the grade level of surrounding traffic roads. Placed under the western stands are 11,000 square meters of sports facilities (three gyms, pool, sauna), official club offices and restaurants, while the eastern stands cover 9,100 square meters of business areas. The inner stadium ground is composed of 105x68 meters football pitch and 8 running tracks surrounding it.

The stadium was refurbished before hosting the 2010 IAAF Continental Cup athletics competition. A new tartan track was constructed, including the introduction of new VIP boxes and seats. In October 2014, following heavy damage from Ultra Europe, a new pitch and drainage system were constructed, replacing the original ones that lasted for 35 years.

In November 2015 the stadium was officially recognized as culture heritage.

International fixtures

References

External links

Virtual Tour
Stadium photos at stadionwelt.de
Aerial Photo from Google Maps

Sports venues in Split, Croatia
Football venues in Croatia
Stadion Poljud
Athletics (track and field) venues in Croatia
Stadion Poljud
Sports venues completed in 1979
Football venues in Yugoslavia
Athletics (track and field) venues in Yugoslavia